Adeel Akhtar (born 18 September 1980) is a British actor. In 2017, he won the British Academy Television Award for Best Actor for his role in Murdered by My Father. He was also nominated for a BAFTA for Best Supporting Actor for his role on Channel 4's Utopia, as well as a British Academy Film Award nomination for Best Actor in a Leading Role for Ali & Ava.

Early life
Akhtar was born in London, to a Pakistani father and a Kenyan mother. He was educated at Cheltenham College Junior School from 1991 to 1994 and then moved to Cheltenham College in Newick House from 1994 to 1999. He originally completed a degree in law from Oxford Brookes University in 2002, but decided to follow his passion and change to acting, training at the Actors Studio Drama School, then within The New School, in New York.

Career
Akhtar's first major role was as the bumbling Muslim extremist Faisal in Chris Morris's film Four Lions. Other comedic performances include Gupta in The Angelos Epithemiou Show, Maroush in The Dictator and Smee in Joe Wright 's Pan.

Akhtar has also won acclaim for his dramatic performances: in 2015, he was nominated for a BAFTA for Best Supporting Actor for his 2014 role as Wilson Wilson on Channel 4's Utopia. He played shopkeeper Ahmed alongside Toby Jones in the BBC mini-series Capital, and DS Ira King in the BBC's River. Reviewing River in The Daily Telegraph, Michael Hogan wrote, "This series was beautifully written by Abi Morgan, stylishly directed, and most of all, superbly acted. The quieter, less showy supporting players also shone. Not just stalwarts [...] but fresher faces: Adeel Akhtar as River's endlessly patient sidekick and Georgina Rich as his psychiatrist".

In 2016 Akhtar appeared as Shahzad in the BBC one-off drama Murdered by My Father. He won the 2017 BAFTA award for Lead Actor for this role, the first non-white actor to do so. In 2017 he also took part in the American romantic comedy film The Big Sick, playing the role of the protagonist's brother, Naveed. He appeared as Rob Singhal in the acclaimed BBC miniseries based on John le Carré's The Night Manager. In 2019, Akhtar appeared as Billy in the BBC Three series, Back to Life, written by Daisy Haggard and Laura Solon, returning in 2021 for the second series.

Filmography

Film

Television

Stage
2008: The Colonel as Zero (Theatre Absolute)
2008: In My Name as Zaeem (Old Red Lion & Trafalgar Studios)
2009: Wuthering Heights as Yusuf (Tamasha Theatre Company)
2010: Satyagraha (Ensemble) (Improbable theatre)
2011–2012: Hamlet as Guildenstern and Francisco (Young Vic Theatre)

Accolades

References

Further reading

External links
 
 
 Adeel Akhtar on Stages of Half Moon

1980 births
Living people
English male film actors
English male stage actors
English male television actors
English people of Pakistani descent
Actors Studio alumni
21st-century English male actors
Male actors from London
English people of Kenyan descent
British film actors of Pakistani descent
People educated at Cheltenham College
Best Actor BAFTA Award (television) winners